"Revolution in the Classroom" was a single released by the Ex Pistols; despite its packaging, the record has nothing to do with the Sex Pistols. The single was released in 1989 on the STP Records label, pressed on various colours of vinyl. The song, along with its B-side "Schools Are Prisons", were both included on the Ex-Pistols album, Deny. They also appear disguised as genuine Sex Pistols recordings on two Sex Pistols retrospective albums by former producer Dave Goodman, Pirates of Destiny (I Swirled Records, 1989) and We Have Cum For Your Children (Skyclad Records, 1988). Under the title "Revolution" the song appears on a German Sex Pistols compilation "Anarchy in the USA" from 1992 released on MBC records. CD 084-60322 LP 008-60321

Credits 
Mastered by Marty Munsch, record producer, (U.S. Release).

References

External links

1989 singles
Sex Pistols
1989 songs